Donald Brown (born November 28, 1963) is a former American football defensive back who played two seasons in the National Football League (NFL) with the Miami Dolphins, San Diego Chargers and New York Giants. He was drafted by the San Diego Chargers in the fifth round of the 1986 NFL Draft. He played college football at the University of Oklahoma before transferring to the University of Maryland. Brown attended Annapolis High School in Annapolis, Maryland. He was also a member of the Miami Hooters of the Arena Football League. He was named Second-team All-Arena in 1994.

References

External links
Just Sports Stats

1963 births
African-American players of American football
American football defensive backs
Living people
Maryland Terrapins football players
Miami Dolphins players
Miami Hooters players
New York Giants players
Oklahoma Sooners football players
Players of American football from Maryland
San Diego Chargers players
Sportspeople from Annapolis, Maryland
21st-century African-American people
20th-century African-American sportspeople